Uncovered  is the ninth studio album by American singer Shawn Colvin.  The work consists of cover songs from other notable musicians.

The album debuted at No. 175 on Billboard 200, selling around 3,000 copies in the first week.  It has sold 12,000 copies in the United States as of May 2016.

Track listing 
 "Tougher Than the Rest" (Bruce Springsteen) – 4:26
 "American Tune" (Paul Simon) – 3:59
 "Baker Street" (Gerry Rafferty) – 4:30
 "Hold On" (Tom Waits, Kathleen Brennan) – 4:18
 "I Used to Be a King" (Graham Nash) – 5:09
 "Private Universe" (Neil Finn) – 3:54
 "Heaven Is Ten Zillion Light Years Away" (Stevie Wonder) – 5:12
 "Gimme Little Sign" (Joseph Hooven, Alfred Smith, Jerry Winn) – 3:10
 "Acadian Driftwood" (Robbie Robertson) – 6:30
 "Lodi" (John Fogerty) – 3:12
 "Not a Drop of Rain" (Robert Earl Keen) – 4:34
 "'Til I Get It Right" (Larry Henley, Red Lane) – 3:19

Personnel
Shawn Colvin – vocals, guitar
David Crosby – vocals ("Baker Street")
Marc Cohn – vocals ("Gimme Little Sign")
Glenn Fukunaga – bass
Mike Meadows – percussion
David Boyle – keyboards
Milo Deering – pedal steel, lap steel, mandola
Steuart Smith – guitar, keyboards, bass ("American Tune")
Production:
Produced by Steuart Smith, Stewart Lerman
Recorded by Stewart Lerman
Assisted by Joseph Holquin, Jacob Sciba
Additional Engineering by Steve Mazur, Sean Kelly
Mixed by Stewart Lerman
Mastered by Paul Blakemore

Chart positions

References 

2015 albums
Shawn Colvin albums
Albums produced by Stewart Lerman
Covers albums